Stefan Quinn Soloviev (born May 21, 1975) is an American businessman who is the Chairman of the Soloviev Group, the parent company of Crossroads Agriculture, the Colorado Pacific Railroad, the Soloviev Building Corporation, Weskan Grain, and other business entities. He took over the Solow Building Corporation from his father Sheldon Solow, after his death on November 17, 2020.

Early life 
Stefan Soloviev is the son of Mia Fonssagrives-Solow and Sheldon Solow. He uses the Russian spelling of the family name as it was before it was Anglicised on arrival at Ellis Island.
He grew up in Manhattan, New York and attended the University of Rhode Island, but did not graduate. He also played football as a placekicker in 1996 at St. John's University in New York, but did not play during season due to injury.

Career 
Soloviev started working in the family real estate business when he was a teenager, in the parking garages in his father's buildings. He dropped out of the University of Rhode Island in the mid-1990s to focus on trading commodities. Crossroads Agriculture was founded in 1999 by Soloviev to cultivate, purchase, store and sell cash grains in the Wichita, Kansas area. By the early 2000s, the company moved to the western edge of the high plains, successfully producing grains in historically dry farming regions using a combination of drought-tolerant seeds and emerging agricultural technology. Starting in 2004, the company began acquiring grasslands south of Portales, New Mexico, and the ranching side of the operation was born. As of 2021, Soloviev owns and operates farmland and ranchland in Colorado, Kansas, New Mexico, Texas, and New York.

Personal life 
Soloviev and his family are Lutheran from his mother's side of the family, which originated in Sweden. Soloviev is divorced and has at least 22 children, 11 from his marriage to his ex-wife Stacey Soloviev. He has eight children that live in Sacramento, California, and another three in other Western states.

References 

Living people
1970s births
20th-century American Jews
American real estate businesspeople
University of Rhode Island alumni
20th-century American businesspeople
21st-century American businesspeople
American people of Jewish descent
American people of French descent
American people of Swedish descent